Polyura is a subgenus of butterflies also referred to as Nawab butterflies and belonging to the brush-footed butterfly subfamily Charaxinae, or leafwing butterflies. Like the large and conspicuous forest queens (subgenus Euxanthe), they belong to the genus Charaxes, unique genus of the tribe Charaxini.

Distribution 
Polyura butterflies are native to the Indomalayan and Australasian realms. They are widespread from Pakistan to Okinawa Island, and from China to Pacific Islands (Fiji, New Caledonia, Vanuatu).

Systematics 
 The subgenus Polyura was described by the Swedish naturalist Gustaf Johan Billberg in 1820.
 The type species is Polyura pyrrhus (Linnaeus).

Taxonomy 
The subgenus was revised in 1982 by Robert Leslie Smiles based on morphological characters.

The genus Polyura was synonymized with the genus Charaxes in 2009 in a study investigating phylogenetic relationships among Charaxini using DNA sequencing. However the genus Charaxes comprises many morphologically very different groups such as the subgenera Euxanthe and Polyura. A phylogenomic study is ongoing to resolve the phylogenetic placements of these different groups. The sister-group to Polyura seems to comprise the African species Charaxes paphianus and Charaxes pleione. Southeast Asian species of the genus Charaxes do not seem to be closely related to species of the subgenus Polyura.

A comprehensive molecular phylogeny of the subgenus as well as several taxonomic studies have allowed a complete revision of the group. A follow-up study investigating the biogeographical history of the subgenus suggested an origin in the Miocene about 12 million years ago in mainland Asia. The Australasian region was colonized later through dispersal.

Species
The subgenus is divided in three morphological groups supported by molecular phylogenetics:

P. athamas group:

 Charaxes agrarius (Swinhoe, 1887) – Anomalous nawab – southern India, Burma
 Charaxes alphius (Staudinger, 1886) – Staudinger's nawab – Sulawesi, Timor
 Charaxes arja (C. & R. Felder, [1867]) – Pallid nawab – north-eastern India, Sikkim, Assam, Burma, Thailand, Indochina
 Charaxes athamas (Drury, [1773]) – Common nawab
 Charaxes attalus (C. & R. Felder, 1867) - Java, Sumatra
 Charaxes bharata (Leech, 1891) –  India
 Charaxes hebe (Butler, [1866]) – Plain nawab
 Charaxes jalysus (C. & R. Felder, [1867]) – Malaysia, Sunda Islands, Thailand
 Charaxes luzonicus (Rothschild, 1899) – Philippines
 Charaxes moori (Distant, 1883) – Malayan nawab – Malaysia, Sunda Islands
 Charaxes paulettae (Toussaint, 2015) – India, Pakistan, Thailand
 Charaxes schreiber (Godart, [1824]) – Blue nawab

P. eudamippus group:
 Charaxes delphis (Doubleday, 1843) – Jewelled nawab – Assam, Burma, Malaya, Sumatra, Borneo
 Charaxes dolon (Westwood, 1847) – Stately nawab – Tibet, China, Kulu, Assam, Burma
 Charaxes eudamippus  (Doubleday, 1843) – Great nawab – central China, Kumaon, Assam, Burma
 Charaxes narcaeus (Hewitson, 1854) – China nawab – China, Naga Hills, Abor Valley, northern Burma
 Charaxes nepenthes (Grose-Smith, 1883) – – eastern China
 Charaxes posidonius (Leech, 1891) – Tibet, China
 Charaxes weismanni – (Fritze 1894) – Okinawa Island.Sometimes subspecies of Polyura eudamippus

P. pyrrhus group:
 Charaxes andrewsi (Butler, 1900) – Christmas emperor – Christmas Island
 Charaxes bicolor (Turlin & Sato, 1995) – Solomon Islands
 Charaxes caphontis (Hewitson, 1863) –  Fiji
 Charaxes clitarchus (Hewitson, 1874) – New Caledonia
 Charaxes cognatus Vollenhoven, 1861 – Sulawesi blue nawab –  Sulawesi
 Charaxes dehanii (Westwood, 1850) –  Java, Sumatra
 Charaxes epigenes (Godman & Salvin, 1888) –  Solomon Islands
 Charaxes gamma (Lathy, 1898) –  New Caledonia
 Charaxes gilolensis (Butler, 1869) – Moluccas
 Charaxes inopinatus (Röber, 1939) –  New Britain
 Charaxes jupiter (Butler, 1869) – New Guinea
 Charaxes pyrrhus  (Linnaeus, 1758) – Tailed nawab, tailed emperor –  Ambon, Ceram
 Charaxes sacco Smart, 1977 – Vanuatu
 Charaxes smilesi (Toussaint, 2015) –  Ceram
 Charaxes sempronius (Fabricius, 1793) – Tailed emperor, four tail – Australia, Lesser Sunda Islands

References

 
Charaxinae
Insect subgenera
Taxa named by Gustaf Johan Billberg